Bergetta "Dorothy" Peterson (25 December 1897 - 3 October 1979) was an American actress. She began her acting career on Broadway before appearing in more than eighty Hollywood films.

Early years
Peterson was born in Hector, Minnesota, the daughter of Oscar Frank Peterson and Emily Johnson Peterson. She had a brother, Buford, and was raised in Zion, Illinois. She was of Swedish ancestry. She studied at a dramatic school, performing in adaptations of Greek plays, and then attended the Chicago Musical College.

Career 
Billed by her birth name, Peterson acted with a company in Icebound at the Montauk Theater in Brooklyn, New York, in September 1923. For two years, Peterson toured with Borgony Hammer's Ibsen Repertory Company. She left that troupe to go to New York, where she began performing in Broadway productions. Broadway plays in which she acted included Subway Express (1929), Dracula (1927), God Loves Us (1926), Pomeroy's Past (1926), Find Daddy (1926), The Fall Guy (1925), All God's Chillun Got Wings (1924), and Cobra (1924).

She made her screen debut in Mothers Cry (1930), a domestic drama that required the 29-year-old actress to age nearly three decades in the course of the film.

Mothers Cry instantly typecast Peterson in careworn maternal roles, which she continued to assay for the rest of her career. Most of her subsequent film assignments were supporting roles like Mrs. Hawkins in Treasure Island. In 1942, she briefly replaced Olive Blakeney as Mrs. Aldrich in the comedy series entry Henry Aldrich for President.

Her last screen appearance was as the mother of  Shirley Temple in That Hagen Girl (1947). Peterson remained active on the New York TV and theatrical scene until the early 1960s. She appeared in more than 80 films, and made several television appearances between 1930 and 1964.

Death 
Peterson died on October 3, 1979. She was buried in Mount Olivet Cemetery in Zion, Illinois.

Filmography

Mothers Cry (1930) - Mary Williams
Up for Murder (1931) - Mrs. Marshall
Party Husband (1931) - Kate
Traveling Husbands (1931) - Martha Hall
The Reckless Hour (1931) - Mrs. Susie Jennison
Bought! (1931) - Mrs. Dale
Penrod and Sam (1931) - Mrs. Schofield
Skyline (1931) - Rose Breen
Way Back Home (1931) - Rose Clark
Rich Man's Folly (1931) - Katherine Trumbull
Emma (1932) - Mrs. Winthrop (uncredited)
Forbidden (1932) - Helen
The Beast of the City (1932) - Mary Fitzpatrick
She Wanted a Millionaire (1932) - Mrs. Miller
Business and Pleasure (1932) - Mrs. Jane Olsen Tinker
So Big! (1932) - Maartje Pool
When a Feller Needs a Friend (1932) - Mrs. Margaret Randall
Night World (1932) - Edith Blair
Attorney for the Defense (1932) - Mrs. Wallace
Thrill of Youth (1932) - Seena Sherwood
Life Begins (1932) - A Patient
The Cabin in the Cotton (1932) - Lilly Blake
Payment Deferred (1932) - Annie Marble
Call Her Savage (1932) - Silas' Wife
The Billion Dollar Scandal (1933) - Mrs. Jackson (scenes deleted)
Reform Girl (1933) - Mrs. Putnam
Hold Me Tight (1933) - Mary Shane (uncredited)
The Mayor of Hell (1933) - Mrs. Smith
I'm No Angel (1933) - Thelma
Big Executive (1933) - Mrs. Sarah Conway
Beloved (1934) - Baroness Irene von Hausmann
As the Earth Turns (1934) - Mil
Men in White (1934) - Nurse Mary (uncredited)
Uncertain Lady (1934) - Cicily Prentiss
Side Streets (1934) - Mrs. Richards
Treasure Island (1934) - Mrs. Hawkins
Peck's Bad Boy (1934) - Aunt Lily Clay
Society Doctor (1935) - Mrs. Harrigan
Sweepstake Annie (1935) - Mrs. Henry Foster
Laddie (1935) - Mrs. Stanton
Pursuit (1935) - Mrs. McCoy
Freckles (1935) - Mrs. Duncan
Man of Iron (1935) - Bessie Bennett
The Country Doctor (1936) - Nurse Katherine Kennedy
The Devil Is a Sissy (1936) - Mrs. Jennie Stevens (uncredited)
Reunion (1936) - Katherine Kennedy
Under Cover of Night (1937) - Susan Nash
Her Husband Lies (1937) - Dorothy Powell
Girl Loves Boy (1937) - Mrs. McCarthy
Confession (1937) - Mrs. Koslov
52nd Street (1937) - Adela Rondell
Hunted Men (1938) - Mary Harris
Breaking the Ice (1938) - Annie Decker
Girls on Probation (1938) - Jane Lennox
The Flying Irishman (1939) - Mrs. Edith Corrigan - Doug's Mother (uncredited)
Dark Victory (1939) - Miss Wainwright
Five Little Peppers and How They Grew (1939) - Mrs. Pepper
Two Bright Boys (1939) - Kathleen O'Donnell
Sabotage (1939) - Edith Grayson
Five Little Peppers at Home (1940) - Mrs. Pepper
Too Many Husbands (1940) - Gertrude Houlihan
Lillian Russell (1940) - Cynthia Leonard
Women in War (1940) - Sister Frances
Out West with the Peppers (1940) - Mrs. Pepper
Five Little Peppers in Trouble (1940) - Mrs. Pepper
Ride, Kelly, Ride (1941) - Mrs. Martin
Cheers for Miss Bishop (1941) - Mrs. Bishop
Henry Aldrich for President (1941) - Mrs. Aldrich
Uncle Joe (1941) - Margaret Day
Saboteur (1942) - Mrs. Mason
The Man in the Trunk (1942) - Lola DeWinters
Air Force (1943) - Mrs. Chester (uncredited)
The Moon Is Down (1943) - Mother (uncredited)
This Is the Army (1943) - Mrs. Nelson
This Is the Life (1944) - Aunt Betsy
Mr. Skeffington (1944) - Manby
When the Lights Go on Again (1944) - Mrs. Clara Benson
The Woman in the Window (1944) - Mrs. Wanley
Faces in the Fog (1944) - Mrs. Mason
Canyon Passage (1946) - Mrs. Dance (uncredited)
Sister Kenny (1946) - Agnes
That Hagen Girl (1947) - Minta Hagen
Escala en Hi-Fi (1963)

References

External links

Dorothy Peterson at Turner Classic Movies

1899 births
1979 deaths
20th-century American actresses
American film actresses
American television actresses
Actresses from Minnesota
American people of Swedish descent
People from Renville County, Minnesota